Jim Cummings (born October 31, 1986) is an American filmmaker, actor, and composer.  He is known for writing, directing and starring in the 2016 short film Thunder Road, which he extended into a 2018 feature film of the same name. He also wrote, directed and starred The Wolf of Snow Hollow (2020), and The Beta Test (2021).

Early life and education 
Cummings is from New Orleans. He graduated from Emerson College in Boston in 2009.

Career 
For his work in Thunder Road (2018), Cummings won the South by Southwest Grand Jury Award for Best Narrative Feature.  He was also nominated for the 2018 Independent Spirit John Cassavetes Award for his work in Thunder Road.

Filmography

Shorts 
As a director
 Brothers (2009)
 The Flamingo (2012)
 Us Funny (2016)
 Call Your Father (2016)
 Thunder Road (2016)
 The Mountains of Mourne (2017)
 Hydrangea (2017)
 The Robbery (2017)
 It's All Right, It's Ok (2017)

Feature films

Acting roles

Awards and nominations

Film festival awards 

Independent Spirit Awards

References

External links
 
 Jim Cummings on Vimeo

Living people
American film editors
American film producers
Film producers from Louisiana
Male actors from New Orleans
21st-century American composers
21st-century American male actors
American film directors
American male screenwriters
American cinematographers
American composers
Screenwriters from Louisiana
1986 births
Emerson College alumni
Sundance Film Festival award winners
American male film score composers
American film score composers
Film directors from Louisiana
American male film actors